Paul Walker (1973−2013) was an American actor. 

Paul Walker may also refer to:
Paul A. Walker (FCC chairman) (1881–1965)
Paul A. Walker (psychologist) (1946–1991), American social psychologist, founding president of World Professional Association of Transgender Health
Paul Walker (American football) (1925–1972)
Paul Walker (footballer, born 1949), English footballer
Paul Walker (footballer, born 1960), English footballer
Paul Walker (footballer, born 1977), Scottish footballer
Paul Walker (footballer, born 1992), Welsh football goalkeeper
Paul Walker (Arctic explorer) (born 1966), English explorer
Paul Walker (Australian footballer) (born 1950)
Paul Walker (judge) (born 1954), High Court judge
Paul Walker (businessman) (born 1957), British businessman
Paul Walker (pole vaulter) (born 1985), Welsh pole vaulter
Paul Walker, former member of Mytown

See also
 Paul Baxendale-Walker, talk show host, lawyer, and author
 Paul's walk